Reza Sahebi ( born February 25, 1972) is a retired Iranian football player and coach.

Playing career

Club career
He played for Payam Mashhad from 1989–1997 before joining F.C. Zob Ahan where he played from 1997–2003. In 2003, he returned to his former club Payam Mashhad. Sahebi was the top goal scorer of the Iranian Football League during the 2000–01 season, when he scored 14 goals for F.C. Zob Ahan. He was captain of Payam Mashhad for many years. He retired in 2007.

Club career statistics

In top league, he has scored 20 goals for Payam and 49 goals for Zobahan.

Managerial career
Payam Mashhad First Team Assistant Coach 2007-June 2010
Payam Mashhad Temporary Head Coach June 2010
Sanat Gaz Sarakhs F.C. Head Coach November 2010-

References

ISNA
rsssf
rsssf

1972 births
Living people
Sportspeople from Mashhad
Iranian footballers
Iranian football managers
Zob Ahan Esfahan F.C. players
Payam Mashhad players
Azadegan League players
Association football forwards